Senator Chafee may refer to:

George D. Chafee (1839–1927), Illinois State Senate
John Chafee (1922–1999), U.S. Senator from Rhode Island from 1976 to 1999 and father of Lincoln
Lincoln Chafee (born 1953), U.S. Senator from Rhode Island from 1999 to 2007

See also
Jerome B. Chaffee (1825–1886), U.S. Senator from Colorado from 1876 to 1879